Rượu thuốc or rượu dân tộc is a kind of Vietnamese distilled liquor (rượu) with herbs and medical animals, considered by traditional medicine as good for health. This drink is a mixture of alcohol mixed with herbs or animals which are used as drink and medicine in Vietnam. In Vietnam, rượu thuốc is widely believed to help drinkers improve their health and virility.

Production
Raw herbs like ginseng, jujube, or raw animals like seahorses, snakes, or termites are placed into a large earthenware jar of alcohol and kept for days to let the expected medical substances in these herbs or animals to dissolve in liquor before the mixture is served. Distilled liquor must be strong enough, with alcoholic concentration of 45% or more.

Drinking
Rượu thuốc is typically drunk before a meal. It is believed among Vietnamese that drinking rượu thuốc may cure or alleviate several diseases (but not the ones caused by viruses or bacteria).

See also
Cơm rượu
Rice wine
Rượu cần
Rượu nếp
Rượu đế
Snake wine
Sơn Tinh (liquor)

References

Vietnamese alcoholic drinks